Kim Rene Nalley (born 1969) is an American jazz and blues singer with a 3½ octave range.

Early life
Raised in New Haven, Connecticut, Nalley is from a musical family that includes jazz drummer and photographer Reggie Jackson, she received piano lessons from her great-grandmother. She attended Educational Center for the Arts (ECA) in New Haven.

Career
Nalley switched to jazz shortly after moving to San Francisco Bay Area in the late 1980s, where she attended University of California, Berkeley (UC Berkeley). She received from UC Berkeley a B.A. degree in History and sang in the Cal Big Band. "She studied classical music and theatre and, while attending college, she gained important experience singing in local clubs and jam sessions."

While performing weekly at the Alta Plaza, director Michael Tilson Thomas discovered Nalley, recorded her in concert, and hired her to sing a program of Gershwin tunes with the San Francisco Symphony. She began performing with the Johnny Nocturne Band, charting at No. 12 on the Gavin list and embarking on a national and international touring schedule that included the Mountain Stage. She also performed at the Teatro Zinzanni as Madame Zinzanni.

After spending a couple of years living in Switzerland, she returned to San Francisco to own and run the Jazz at Pearl's North Beach night club during 2003–2008.

Discography

As leader
 Need My Sugar (CE Jazz & Blues, 2002)
 She Put a Spell on Me: Kim Nalley Sings Nina Simone (CE Jazz & Blues, 2006)
 Ballads for Billie (CE Jazz & Blues, 2006)
 Christmas Time Is Here (2010)
 Blues People (2015)

As guest
With Rhoda Scott
Beyond the Sea (Doodlin')

References

External links
 Official site

1969 births
Living people
American jazz singers
American women jazz singers
American blues singers
Singers from California
Jazz musicians from California
21st-century American women